Birta Abiba Þórhallsdóttir (born 1 September 1999) is an Icelandic-Congolese model and beauty pageant titleholder who was crowned Miss Universe Iceland 2019. She represented Iceland at Miss Universe 2019, where she placed in the top 10.

Early life
Birta was born and raised in Mosfellsbær, a town just outside of Reykjavík. She is of partial Congolese descent. Throughout her life, Birta was the victim of racism, having experienced violence and verbal abuse because of her skin color. Birta has worked for the  International Red Cross study aid program, in an effort to encourage children's literacy and education abroad. As a teenager, Birta wrote a full-length novel.

Pageantry
Birta represented Geysir at the Miss Universe Iceland 2019 which was held on 31 August 2019 at the Stapi Hall Hljómahöll in Njarðvík. She was one of the winners and was crowned as Miss Universe Iceland 2019, being crowned by outgoing titleholder Katrín Lea Elenudóttir.  As Miss Universe Iceland, Þórhallsdóttir represented Iceland at the Miss Universe 2019 competition, where she placed in the top 10.

References

External links

1999 births
Birta Abiba Þórhallsdóttir
Birta Abiba Þórhallsdóttir
Birta Abiba Þórhallsdóttir
Living people
Miss Universe 2019 contestants
Birta Abiba Þórhallsdóttir